ImmoAgentur Stadion is a multi-use stadium in Bregenz, Austria.  It is currently used mostly for football matches and is the home ground of SC Bregenz.  The stadium had a capacity of 11,112 people. It now has a capacity of 5,000 with the installation of seats.

References

External links

Stadium picture with the new seats

SW Bregenz
Football venues in Austria
Sports venues in Vorarlberg